Nicolaus von Braun (circa 1640 – 1718) was the regimental quartermaster at the Garrison Regiment in Malmö, Sweden.

Biography
Nicolaus von Braun, was born around 1640 in Pomerania. He immigrated to Sweden in 1669 and was probably introduced at court in Stockholm by his cousin Nicodemus Tessin the Elder He served at the Riksänkedrottningens Regiment starting in 1673, and the Mountain Regiment starting in 1677. He participated in the Battle of Lund in 1676, where he was injured. Over the years, 1695-97/98, he was enlisted as an officer for William III of England. He was regimental quartermaster at the Garrison Regiment in Malmö, Sweden in 1705. He was head of the city guard. In 1710, he retired and in 1717, he was forced to sell his farm in Malmö. He died destitute in 1718.

References

 Norström, Åke and Bjernehed, Tobias: Nicolaus von Braun - the major city of Malmö 1705–1710, in: Malmö Fornminnesförening yearbook, Volume 71, Malmö 2003rd

1640 births
1718 deaths
17th-century Swedish military personnel
18th-century Swedish military personnel
Swedish people of German descent
17th-century soldiers